Lake Melville is a provincial electoral district for the House of Assembly of Newfoundland and Labrador, Canada. As of 2011, there are 6,647 eligible voters living within the district.

The district includes Happy Valley-Goose Bay, Churchill Falls, North West River, Sheshatshiu and Mud Lake. Happy Valley-Goose Bay is a service and defence town. Aboriginal issues, defence spending, hydroelectric power and control over development of forest resources are the major issues of the district.

Sheshatshiu, a federal Innu reserve, is located approximately 30 kilometres north of Goose Bay.

Members of the House of Assembly
The district has elected the following Members of the House of Assembly:

Election results 

|}

|}

|-

|-

|-
 
|NDP
|Bill Cooper
|align="right"|147
|align="right"|3.5%
|align="right"|
|}

|-

|-

|-

|-
 
|NDP
|Barbara Stickley  
|align="right"|135
|align="right"|2.98%
|align="right"|
|}

|-

|-
 
|NDP
|Ronald W. Peddle  
|align="right"|323
|align="right"|8.8%
|align="right"|
|-
|}

References

External links 
Website of the Newfoundland and Labrador House of Assembly

Newfoundland and Labrador provincial electoral districts